Willy Dujardin was a Belgian sprinter. He competed in the men's 100 metres at the 1928 Summer Olympics.

References

External links
 Athlete profile at the International Olympic Committee website

Year of birth missing
Year of death missing
Athletes (track and field) at the 1928 Summer Olympics
Belgian male sprinters
Olympic athletes of Belgium
Place of birth missing